| budget             = 
| network            = Syfy
| first_aired        = 
| last_aired         =
}}

Zodiac: Signs of the Apocalypse is a 2014 Canadian science fiction disaster television film directed  for Syfy by (William) David Hogan as W. D. Hogan.

Plot

When archaeologists unearth a 2,000-year-old astrology carving in a Peruvian lead mine, global cataclysms start to destroy the globe: explosive meteor storms, tsunamis, lightning storms, lava geysers and giant waterspouts erupt everywhere, each disaster corresponding to a specific sign of the zodiac. While the artifact discovered in the dig falls into the wrong hands of a government agency that kills to hide the secret, a divorced university professor, his estranged son and two scientists race against time and carnage to decipher the symbols on the artifact as a prediction of the coming of Nibiru, a mythical ninth planet believed to bring the Apocalypse when it crosses the sun. They realize that the only way to avert the end of the world is to recover the object and return it to its rightful place by activating an ancient civilization's Armageddon machine.

Cast
 OG Buhle OJ as Sophie's Male Friend 
 Joel Gretsch as Professor Neil Martin
 Emily Holmes as Kathryn Keen
 Reilly Dolman as Colin Martin
 Andrea Brooks as Sophie
 Aaron Douglas as Agent Woodward
 Ben Cotton as Marty Fitzgerald
 Christopher Lloyd as Harry Setag
 Douglas Chapman as Agent Tyler
 Russell Roberts as Dr. Bowles
 Raf Rogers as Joel
 Matthew Linnitt as Pilot
 Jessica Storm Smith as Jennifer
 Jeffrey Klassen as Agent

References

External links
  at Syfy
  at CineTel Films
 
 
 

2014 television films
2014 films
2010s English-language films
2010s disaster films
2014 science fiction action films
Canadian disaster films
Canadian science fiction action films
Canadian science fiction television films
English-language Canadian films
CineTel Films films
Syfy original films
Peru in fiction
Disaster television films
Films about impact events
Films directed by W. D. Hogan
2010s Canadian films
2010s American films